Bukowo  is a village in the administrative district of Gmina Polanów, within Koszalin County, West Pomeranian Voivodeship, in north-western Poland.

The village has a population of 320.

References

Bukowo